Edward Noonan Ney (May 26, 1925 – January 8, 2014) was the chief executive officer of advertising agency Young & Rubicam from 1970 to 1986, and served as United States Ambassador to Canada from 1989 to 1992.

Biography

Early life
Edward N. Ney was born in Saint Paul, Minnesota on May 26, 1925, the son of John J. Ney, a manager for American Standard Brands.  He went to high school at the John Burroughs School in St. Louis, Missouri.  He then attended Amherst College. During World War II, he served in the United States Naval Air Corps. After the war, he returned to Amherst and received his B.A. in 1946.

In 1950, Ney married Suzanne Hayes and together the couple had three children, Nicholas (b. Feb. 12, 1953), Hillary (b. 1954), and Michelle (b. Dec. 9, 1955). In 1974 they divorced and he married Judy Lasky the same year. In 2010, he married a last time Patricia Wood, widow of tennis champion Sidney Wood and sister of fashion editor Catherine Murray di Montezemolo.

Career
In 1951, Ney joined Young & Rubicam, the world's largest advertising communications company, as an account manager. Ney worked his way up the ranks at Young & Rubicam, eventually becoming the company's president and then, in 1970, its chief executive officer, a position he held until 1986. He was chairman of Young & Rubicam from 1986 until 1989. He was also Vice-Chairman of Paine Webber during the same years.  Ney was inducted into the American Advertising Federation Hall of Fame in 1988.

Besides his work at Young & Rubicam, Ney was active in the Republican Party. He became a member of the Council on Foreign Relations in 1974.  President of the United States Gerald Ford appointed Ney to the board of Radio Free Europe/Radio Liberty in 1975. He was a trustee of the National Urban League from 1977 to 1986. He chaired the Visiting Committee on Afro-American Studies at Harvard University from 1977 until 1984. In 1982, President Ronald Reagan appointed Ney to the executive committee of the Grace Commission, where he served until 1986. He became a trustee of the Museum of Television and Radio in 1982, and of the George Bush Presidential Library in 1994.

In 1989, President George H. W. Bush nominated Ney as United States Ambassador to Canada. Ambassador Ney presented his credentials on June 30, 1989 and served in Ottawa until June 20, 1992.

After his time as ambassador, Ney returned to Young & Rubicam as chairman.

Ney sat on the Boards of Directors of several corporations, including Barrick Gold, Power Corporation of Canada and Mattel.

Ney died at the age of 88 on January 8, 2014.

Recognition
 1989, International Radio & Television Society Gold Medal
 1987, Advertising Hall of Fame
 1975, Golden Plate Award of the American Academy of Achievement

References

External links
Profile from the Council of American Ambassadors

1925 births
Ambassadors of the United States to Canada
2014 deaths
Businesspeople from Saint Paul, Minnesota
Amherst College alumni
United States Navy personnel of World War II
American advertising executives
Minnesota Republicans
20th-century American businesspeople